Peter Joseph O'Loghlen (1883 – 25 October 1971) was an Irish Fianna Fáil politician. A publican, he was first elected to Dáil Éireann as a Teachta Dála (TD) for the Clare constituency at the 1938 general election. He was lost his Dáil seat at the 1943 general election but was nominated by the Taoiseach to the 4th Seanad. 

He regained his Dáil seat at the 1944 general election. He did not contest the 1948 general election. O'Loghlen was a leading member of, and main political representative for the conservative Catholic group, An Ríoghacht.

References

1883 births
1971 deaths
Fianna Fáil TDs
Members of the 10th Dáil
Members of the 4th Seanad
Members of the 12th Dáil
Politicians from County Clare
Nominated members of Seanad Éireann
Fianna Fáil senators